The 2014 Men's Under 18 Australian Championships was a field hockey tournament held in Australia's capital city, Canberra from 4–12 April.

QLD won the gold medal, defeating NSW State 8–2 in the final. WA won the bronze medal by defeating VIC Blue 5–1 in the third place playoff.

Teams

 ACT
 NSW Blue
 NSW State
 NT
 QLD
 SA
 TAS
 VIC Blue
 VIC White
 WA

Results

Preliminary round

Pool A

Pool B

Classification round

Fifth to tenth place classification

Crossover matches

Ninth and tenth place

Seventh and eighth place

Fifth and sixth place

First to fourth place classification

Semi-finals

Third and fourth place

Final

Awards

Statistics

Final standings

References

External links

2014 in Australian field hockey